Lem Springsteen is an American songwriter and dance and house music producer. He is best known as part of house production duo Mood II Swing.

In 1997, he co-wrote and co-produced Ultra Naté's hit song "Free", a dance-hop influenced disco track released on the Strictly Rhythm label. The song peaked at number 1 on both the US Hot Dance Club Songs and Hot Dance Music/Maxi-Singles Sales charts as well as placing on a number of charts in other countries. The song has appeared on a number of '90s Music compilation albums, and was featured on soundtracks for Chasing Liberty and I Know What You Did Last Summer.

Biography
Springsteen was signed to EMI Music Publishing in London for several years after co-writing and co-producing the hit recording "Free" by Ultra Nate in 1997.  He entered the music business at the age of 16 years old, after manager, at the time Vaughan Mason, who had hit recordings, procured a single deal with the now defunct label Chrysalis Records UK, after Lem and younger brother won a talent contest at New York City's Apollo Theatre.  Vaughan taught Lem, songwriting, analog sythns and analog recording, before the digital era.  Lem's style incorporates the music he grew up on from soul/R&B to pop to disco/dance.  Lem even has some rock influences but does not claim to be a rock'n roll musician or producer.

Springsteen formed the house production duo Mood II Swing with John Ciafone in 1993 after the pair began to work with Little Louie Vega of Masters At Work. In addition to productions with Masters At Work and Nuyorican Soul, Mood II Swing was hired by major and independent labels globally to remix dance versions of songs signed to labels from 1993 – 2003. Their notable remixes include BT's "Remember", King Britt's "The Reason", and Ultra Naté's Found A Cure, which they also wrote and produced originally.

Mood II Swing produced many remixes in the 1990s and early 2000s, remixing about 300 tracks and producing about 100 original songs. Their music was included in the Strictly Rhythm 25 Year Anniversary compilation, Strictly DJ T: 25 Years Of Strictly Rhythm, released in March 2015. Their original productions as Mood II Swing include "Closer" and "All Night Long". Their original track "Do It Your Way" and their original production "Closer" featuring Carol Sylvan were included on For The Love Of House Volume 2, released by Defected Records in 2013.

1993, under the name Urbanized, was the year Lem & John entered the world of dance music producing the song titled "Helpless" featuring vocalist Silvano, which Mercury Records picked up from the NY independent label, Maxi
records.  The late manager Jazz Summers, who represented Lisa Stansfield, at the time, became interested in developing an Urbanized album which never became finalized.

In 1995 Lem Springsteen produced The Wall of Sound featuring Gerald Lethan single Run to Me. and a live band album called Storybook, featuring Gerald Lethan. However the label wasn't interested
in pushing a live band neo-soul type album.

In 1995 Springsteen was listed in the production credits for a track on Janet Jackson's remix album, Janet Remixed, playing keyboards for David Morales remix to Janet's song Throb. The album went platinum in the UK.  He also played and sang backgrounds for Satoshie Tomii's remix of
"Romantic Call" by: Queen Latifah and Patra.  He played experimental keys for KRS-One's production for
Mad Lion recorded at Bass Hit recording studios, New York city.  He's done dance remixes for major and independent artists in America and Europe.  The most noteworthy vocal remix by Mood II Swing is "Don't Mess With 
My Man" by: Lucy Pearl for Virgin UK.

The Mood II Swing dissolved in 2008 in order for Springsteen and Ciafone to pursue individual interests.
In 2010 Springsteen set up an indie imprint Urban Lounge Music, and has released a number of solo tracks and remixes, including Joi Cardwell's "Feels Like Heaven", Vanessa Daou's "Trouble Comes", and Information Society's "Running 2K14".

References

External links
Official website
Urban Lounge Music
"Lem Springsteen" profile at Traxsource.

Year of birth missing (living people)
Living people
American record producers
American house musicians